Alliopsis billbergi is a species of fly in the family Anthomyiidae. It is found in the  Palearctic . The larvae are phytophagous.

References

External links
 Ecology of Commanster 

Anthomyiidae
Insects described in 1838
Taxa named by Johan Wilhelm Zetterstedt